South Carolina Highway 243 (SC 243) is a  state highway in the U.S. state of South Carolina. The highway travels on an east–west direction (though signed as north–south) from SC 59 and SC 182 in Fair Play to Interstate 85 (I-85) exit 11 and SC 24. The highway closely parallels I-85 to the north.

Route description
SC 243 begins at an intersection with SC 59 and SC 182 in the census designated place of Fair Play, Oconee County. Numerous businesses surround the intersection which also is the southern terminus of SC 182. SC 243 travels east along East Fair Play Boulevard past houses, a store, churches, a cemetery, and a post office. Whitfield Road splits off from the road and travels south to I-85's exit 4. SC 243 continues east-northeast into Anderson County through a mix of farmland and woods. At the highway's end, it intersects SC 24 in front of a cafe. On the opposite side of SC 24, I-85's exit 11 southbound on and off-ramps are present. The northbound ramps of the interchange are located south of this point near SC 24.

History

Major intersections

See also

References

External links

SC 243 at Virginia Highways' South Carolina Highways Annex

243
Transportation in Oconee County, South Carolina
Transportation in Anderson County, South Carolina